Flavicella sediminum is a Gram-negative, rod-shaped, aerobic and motile bacterium from the genus of Flavicella which has been isolated from marine sediments from the Ailian bay in China.

References 

Flavobacteria
Bacteria described in 2020